Marcus Deshon Haislip (born December 22, 1980) is an American former professional basketball player who played in the National Basketball Association (NBA) and other top leagues. Haislip attended Marshall County High School in Lewisburg, Tennessee. He rose to prominence while playing college basketball with the University of Tennessee from 1999 to 2002. After college, he played for several seasons in the NBA and the EuroLeague. (104 kg).

Professional career
Haislip was selected by the Milwaukee Bucks as the 13th pick of the 2002 NBA draft. During his rookie year Haislip was inserted into the starting line-up for the final nine games of the 2002–03 NBA season. When the playoffs started he was relegated to the bench. He remained a bench player with the Bucks for his first two seasons until being placed on waivers on November 4, 2004. He was signed by the Indiana Pacers during the 2004–05 season in order to fill the team's gap at power forward, due to the 15-game suspension of Jermaine O'Neal.

He started playing for Ülkerspor in the 2005–06 season. In March 2006, he left the team without authorization and returned to the United States due to "family issues", according to a teammate. He was selected to the BSL (Turkish Basketball Super League) All-Star Game and also participated in the Slam Dunk contest, which he won. He signed with Turkish Basketball League powerhouse Efes Pilsen in August 2006.

Haislip returned to the U.S. with Pilsen in October 2006, when the team played a pair of exhibition games against NBA teams. Pilsen played the Denver Nuggets in Denver on October 11, and played the Golden State Warriors in Oakland on October 13. Haislip scored 13 points and added 9 rebounds against the Warriors. On July 13, 2007, Haislip signed with the Spanish ACB club Unicaja Málaga.

Haislip was signed by the San Antonio Spurs of the NBA on July 8, 2009. He was waived by the Spurs on January 22, 2010, after appearing in ten games for them. That tenth game that Haislip played for the Spurs ended up being his final game in the NBA. His final game was played on January 16, 2010 in a 86 - 92 loss to the Memphis Grizzlies where he recorded 4 points and 3 rebounds.

On January 24, 2010, Haislip signed with the Greek Basket League powerhouse Panathinaikos. He was released on April 16, 2010.

In September 2010, he signed with the Spanish powerhouse Caja Laboral. In December 2010, Caja Laboral opened disciplinary proceedings against Haislip because he left the city without permission from the club. He was suspended without pay. The contract was terminated by mutual consent on January 5, 2011.

On January 13, 2011 he signed with the Guangdong Southern Tigers in China. In December 2011, he signed with the Foshan Dralions.

In March 2012, he signed a two-month contract with Champville SC, and became the highest paid foreigner in the history of the Lebanese Basketball League. Together with his teammate Fadi El Khatib, they won the Lebanese championship for their first time. Champville didn't renew his contract the following year.

In September 2012, he joined the Dongguan Leopards of the Chinese Basketball Association for the 2012–13 season. For the next season he stayed in China but moved to Jiangsu Dragons.

On November 24, 2014, Haislip signed a one-month deal with Club Africain of the Tunisian League. On December 24, 2014, he signed with Eskişehir Basket of Turkey for the rest of the season.

In December 2015, he signed with Türk Telekom for the rest of the 2015–16 season. In May 2016, he signed in China with the Guizhou White Tigers for the 2016 NBL season.

In August 2016, Haislip signed with Turkish club Gaziantep Basketbol.

Career statistics

EuroLeague

|-
| style="text-align:left;"| 2005–06
| style="text-align:left;"| Ülkerspor 
| 17 || 15 || 28.3 || .456 || .412 || .590 || 6.3 || .6 || .9 || 1.6 || 11.9 || 13.6
|-
| style="text-align:left;"| 2006–07
| style="text-align:left;"| Efes Pilsen
| 20 || 19 || 27.8 || .490 || .376 || .754 || 6.7 || .4 || .7 || style="background:#cfecec;"|1.8 || 14.1 || 16.1
|-
| style="text-align:left;"| 2007–08
| style="text-align:left;"| Unicaja Málaga
| 15 || 15 || 25.3 || .491 || .359 || .795 || 4.6 || .6 || .6 || .8 || 13.7 || 12.2
|-
| style="text-align:left;"| 2008–09
| style="text-align:left;"| Unicaja Málaga
| 14 || 12 || 27.4 || .391 || .245 || .815 || 4.9 || .5 || .6 || .4 || 11.2 || 10.5
|-
| style="text-align:left;"| 2009–10
| style="text-align:left;"| Panathinaikos
| 6 || 2 || 17.5 || .400 || .125 || .692 || 3.3 || .0 || .2 || .0 || 5.7 || 4.2
|-
| style="text-align:left;"| 2010–11
| style="text-align:left;"| Caja Laboral 
| 5 || 2 || 10.1 || .667 || .333 || .000 || 1.2 || .0 || .4 || .6 || 4.6 || 4.2
|- class="sortbottom"
| style="text-align:center;" colspan="2"| Career
| 77 || 65 || 25.4 || .462 || .332 || .719 || 5.2 || .4 || .6 || 1.1 || 11.7 || 12.1

NBA

Regular season

|-
| style="text-align:left;"| 
| style="text-align:left;"| Milwaukee
| 39 || 8 || 11.3 || .431 || .250 || .684 || 1.4 || .2 || .2 || .5 || 4.1
|-
| style="text-align:left;"| 
| style="text-align:left;"| Milwaukee
| 31 || 0 || 8.5 || .486 || .500 || .714 || 1.7 || .1 || .2 || .4 || 3.0
|-
| style="text-align:left;"| 
| style="text-align:left;"| Indiana
| 9 || 0 || 11.7 || .342 || .000 || .545 || 1.7 || .3 || .2 || .2 || 3.6
|-
| style="text-align:left;"| 
| style="text-align:left;"| San Antonio
| 10 || 0 || 4.4 || .476 || .600 || .400 || 1.0 || .0 || .0 || .2 || 2.5
|- class="sortbottom"
| style="text-align:center;" colspan="2"| Career
| 89 || 8 || 9.6 || .437 || .350 || .659 || 1.5 || .2 || .2 || .4 || 3.5

Playoffs

|-
| style="text-align:left;"| 2003
| style="text-align:left;"| Milwaukee
| 2 || 1 || 12.0 || .667 || – || .500 || 2.0 || 1.0 || 1.0 || .5 || 5.0
|-
| style="text-align:left;"| 2004
| style="text-align:left;"| Milwaukee
| 1 || 0 || 3.0 || 1.000 || – || – || 1.0 || .0 || .0 || .0 || 2.0
|- class="sortbottom"
| style="text-align:center;" colspan="2"| Career
| 3 || 1 || 9.0 || .714 || – || .500 || 1.7 || .7 || .7 || .3 || 4.0

References

External links
 NBA.com Profile
 Euroleague.net Profile
 ACB.com Profile 
 Eurobasket.com Profile

1980 births
Living people
African-American basketball players
American expatriate basketball people in China
American expatriate basketball people in Greece
American expatriate basketball people in Lebanon
American expatriate basketball people in Spain
American expatriate basketball people in Turkey
American men's basketball players
Anadolu Efes S.K. players
Basketball players from Tennessee
Baloncesto Málaga players
Club Africain basketball players
Eskişehir Basket players
Gaziantep Basketbol players
Greek Basket League players
Guangdong Southern Tigers players
Guangzhou Loong Lions players
Indiana Pacers players
Jiangsu Dragons players
Liga ACB players
Milwaukee Bucks draft picks
Milwaukee Bucks players
Panathinaikos B.C. players
People from Lewisburg, Tennessee
Power forwards (basketball)
San Antonio Spurs players
Saski Baskonia players
Shenzhen Leopards players
Tennessee Volunteers basketball players
Türk Telekom B.K. players
Ülker G.S.K. basketball players
21st-century African-American sportspeople
20th-century African-American people